David Allen Mahonski (May 27, 1958 - November 28, 1992) was an electrician from Williamsport, Pennsylvania who was shot by a White House guard on 15 March 1984. The 25-year-old had been under FBI surveillance for making threats against then-president Ronald Reagan. He had been warned to stay away from the White House by United States Secret Service officers in the months leading up to the shooting.

On the day of the shooting he was noticed in front of the south grounds of the White House by security agents who then approached him. He pulled a sawed-off shotgun from beneath his coat, and one of the agents shot him in the arm with a revolver. He was subsequently arrested.

He was arraigned on March 16, and scheduled for a psychiatric evaluation which later detected 'emotional problems.'

Notes
 - Many later sources have given the date of the shooting as Mar. 3 (e.g.).  However news reports at the time indicate it took place on 15 March.

References

White House intruders
People from Williamsport, Pennsylvania
1958 births
1992 deaths